Nash TV is an American video on demand television network owned by Cumulus Media, building on Cumulus' Nash FM and Nash Icon brand. The channel launched January 26, 2015.

Details
Nash TV is an extended platform of Cumulus' Nash FM and Nash Icon brand, with an emphasis on the country music genre. The network began expanding its platform to television in November 2014 in a deal with multi-platform music network Music Choice by providing NASH programming for MC's Music Channels, VOD and digital Video Channel. On January 20, 2015, Cumulus announced the launching of Nash TV with a preview of twelve shows that incorporates the modern-day Country lifestyle.

It was announced on June 18, 2015, that Nash TV will become available on Mobile Devices which include Apple TV, Android TV, Roku, PlayStation 3 and 4, Xbox 360 and 1, Google Chromecast, Samsung and Sony smart TV's, and all smartphone platforms.

It was then announced on August 11, 2015, that Nash TV would expand into the Film & Movie Industry by creating Nash TV Films

List of Nash TV Programs
America's Morning Show 
Nash Nights Live
Kickin' It With Kix
Grits & Hits
Red Carpet Live
Nash Lash
Real Live Performances
Proud:Everyday American Heroes
Picks From The Sticks
AMO: American Music Overseas
BBQ Tricks
HickXtreme

References

External links
 

2015 establishments in the United States
Television networks in the United States
American country music
Television channels and stations established in 2015
Video on demand services
Cumulus Media radio stations